Cyrtostylis robusta, commonly known as large gnat-orchid or mosquito orchid, is a species of orchid endemic to southern Australia. It usually has a single more or less round leaf and a flowering spike with up to seven reddish flowers with a shelf-like labellum.

Description
The leaf is light to medium green on the upper surface and silvery on the lower side. The petals are similar in size and shape to the lateral sepals and curve forwards or slightly downwards. Flowering occurs from May to October.

This species is similar to C. huegelii in Western Australia but usually has fewer, more brightly-coloured flowers with a wider labellum. In South Australia is can be distinguished from the similar C. reniformis which has more heavily veined leaves and are green on the lower side.

Taxonomy and naming
Cyrtostylis robusta was first formally described in 1987 by David Jones and Mark Clements. The description was published in the journal Lindleyana from a specimen collected near Jerramungup.
The specific epithet (robusta) is a Latin word meaning "oaken" or "strong like oak".

Distribution and habitat
The large gnat orchid occurs in southern Victoria where it grows in coastal scrub and forest. It is found in south-eastern South Australia including Kangaroo Island and in Tasmania. It is most common and widespread in the south-west of Western Australia where it grows in near-coastal shrubland, woodland and forest between Perth and Israelite Bay.

Conservation
Cyrtostylis robusta is listed as "rare" in Tasmania under the Threatened Species Protection Act 1995.

References

External links
 
 

robusta
Endemic orchids of Australia
Orchids of South Australia
Orchids of Tasmania
Orchids of Victoria (Australia)
Orchids of Western Australia
Plants described in 1987